The river Valserine is a tributary of the Rhône that flows for  from the Col de la Faucille in the Jura Mountains to its confluence with the Rhône at Bellegarde-sur-Valserine. The Valserine Valley has great charm; it includes the Pont des Pierres that spans the river between Montanges and Mulaz (in the commune of Confort), as well as the Pertes de la Valserine just north of Bellegarde-sur-Valserine, a canyon in which during the dry season the Valserine runs underground.

As the river flows through the village of Mijoux, it marks the border between Ain (a department in the Auvergne-Rhône-Alpes region) and Jura (in Bourgogne-Franche-Comté).

See also
 Frainc-Comtou dialect
 Parc naturel régional du Haut-Jura
 Jura Mountains

References

Further reading
 Parks, Reserves, and Other Protected Areas in France  (Haut-Jura and Pont-des-Pierres)
 Natura 2000 : Fiche du site FR8201648 (GALERIE A CHAUVES-SOURIS DU PONT DES PIERRES) (French)

Rivers of France
Rivers of Auvergne-Rhône-Alpes
Rivers of Bourgogne-Franche-Comté
Rivers of Ain
Rivers of Jura (department)